The Nggela Islands, also known as the Florida Islands, are a small island group in the Central Province of Solomon Islands, a sovereign state (since 1978) in the southwest Pacific Ocean.

The chain is composed of four larger islands and about 50 smaller islands. The two main islands, Nggela Sule and Nggela Pile to its southeast, are separated by a channel, Mboli Passage. The name Florida Island is sometimes also used to refer to Nggela Sule. The other two large islands lie northwest of Nggela Sule; Sandfly (also known as Mobokonimbeti or Olevugha) and, further northwest, Buenavista (also known as Vatilau).

Many of the smaller islands have white coral beaches. North of Nggela Sule is Anuha, and just off the southwest coast of Nggela Sule is Tulagi. the capital of Central Province. Other islands include Gavutu and Tanambogo.

History
The first recorded sighting by Europeans was by the Spanish expedition of Álvaro de Mendaña on 16 April 1568. More precisely the sighting was due to a local voyage done by a small boat, in the accounts the brigantine Santiago, commanded by Maestre de campo Pedro Ortega Valencia and having Hernán Gallego as pilot. They were who charted it as "Pascua Florida" (from the festival of that name) from where its present-day name "Florida" derives. Tulagi in Nggela Sule was the seat of the administration of the British Solomon Islands prior to the 1942 Japanese invasion in World War II.

The Nggela Islands group lies immediately north of the more famous island of Guadalcanal, the scene of the Guadalcanal Campaign during World War II; however, Nggela Sule itself was garrisoned by the Japanese in April 1942 in connection with their efforts to establish a seaplane base on neighbouring Gavutu. On 7 August of the same year, the United States 1st Battalion, 2nd Marine Regiment landed on the island to provide cover for the assault on the neighbouring Tulagi islet. Florida Island served as a small, secondary base of operations for the US and Australian and New Zealand war effort in the Pacific for the duration of the war. Following the Allied liberation of the island from the Japanese, it became the site of a US seaplane base. About 80 Japanese troops from Tulagi escaped to Florida Island and fought Marine and British Solomon Islands Protectorate Defence Force patrols for the next two months until being wiped out. The island subsequently served as a watering point for the US Navy, diverting water from an underground source on the island.

After World War II, the British administration moved to Honiara, Guadalcanal.

Fauna
The Florida naked-tailed rat – possibly extinct – was endemic to the Nggela Islands. The black rat was introduced.

Other animals include:
 dark sheath-tailed bat
 diadem leaf-nosed bat
 dwarf flying fox
 Geoffroy's rousette
 great bent-winged bat
 island tube-nosed fruit bat
 long-tongued nectar bat
 Solomon's naked-backed fruit bat
 Woodford's fruit bat

References

External links
 Map including the Nggela Islands (labelled as Florida Islands)

Islands of the Solomon Islands
Archipelagoes of the Pacific Ocean